A. commutata may refer to:

 Abarema commutata, a South American legume
 Alsophila commutata, a tree fern
 Ambaiba commutata, a least concern plant
 Amphiura commutata, a brittle star
 Artemisia commutata, a herbaceous plant